David Habib (born 16 March 1961) is French politician who has served as a member of the National Assembly for Pyrénées-Atlantiques's 3rd constituency since 2002. A member of the Socialist Party, Habib was the vice-president of the National Assembly from October of 2019 to June of 2022. He also served as mayor of Mourenx from 1995 to 2014 and general councillor of Pyrénées-Atlantiques from 1992 to 2002.

Early life and education
David Habib was born to a family of Tunisian Jews in Paris, France on 16 March 1961. When he was six months old, his father moved the family to Pau, Pyrénées-Atlantiques for career-related reasons. Habib attended Sciences Po Bordeaux, graduating in 1983.

Political career
Habib began his political career on the municipal council of Mourenx, Pyrénées-Atlantiques, to which he was elected in the 1989 French municipal elections. He was then appointed deputy mayor by the town's Communist mayor André Cazetien. In March of 1992, Habib was elected to the General Council of Pyrénées-Atlantiques, representing the Canton of Lagord. This was followed by his election as mayor of Mourenx in the 1995 municipal elections. Habib was re-elected as general councillor in the 2001 municipal elections and became president of the community of communes of Lacq in 2002.

Habib entered national politics in the 2002 French legislative elections, where he was elected member of the National Assembly for Pyrénées-Atlantiques's 3rd constituency. As a deputy, he joined the Socialist group. Habib then resigned from the general council of Pyrénées-Atlantiques in accordance with the law on the accumulation of political mandates.

Habib was re-elected to the National Assembly in the 2007 and 2012 legislative elections as well as the mayoralty of Mourenx in the 2008 municipal elections. In March of 2014, he announced his candidacy for mayor of Pau at the head of a united electoral list of major left-wing parties. Habib was defeated in the second round of the 2014 municipal elections, winning 37% of the vote against François Bayrou's 63%. Nevertheless, the Socialist did gain a seat on city's municipal council, but resigned several months later to run in a municipal by-election in Sarpourenx on 21 June 2015. He was successfully elected to the city's municipal council and has served there since.

On 1 January 2015, Habib succeeded Christophe Sirugue as second vice-president of the National Assembly. He endorsed Manuel Valls in the 2017 Socialist presidential primary and was one of his eight campaign spokespersons. Habib was again re-elected in the 2017 legislative elections and was one of three deputies from the Socialist group to vote yes on a motion of confidence in the Second Philippe government. 

During the 2022 legislative elections, Habib opposed the NUPES electoral alliance between the Socialists and La France Insoumise and instead called for his party to unite behind President Emmanuel Macron of La République En Marche. As a result, the governing Ensemble! coalition did not run a candidate against him in his re-election race and Hadid returned to the National Assembly with 66.55% of the vote in the second round against Jean-François Baby of NUPES, who won 33.45%.

Habib sits on the National Defence and Armed Forces Committee, for which he served as vice-president from 2 October 2020 to 8 July 2021. He has previously been a member of the Social Affairs Committee, the Economic Affairs Committee, the Foreign Affairs Committee, the Finance, General Economy and Budgetary Monitoring Committee, the Constitutional Acts, Legislation and General Administration Committee and the now-defunct Economic, Environmental and Territorial Affairs Committee. In addition to his committee assignments, Habib is part of the Tibet Study Group and was formerly part of the French delegation to the Inter-Parliamentary Union (IPU). He is also vice-president of the Israel Friendship Group and was one of the only Socialist signatories of a letter to President Nicolas Sarkozy opposing potential French recognition of the State of Palestine.

References

1961 births
Living people
Socialist Party (France) politicians
Deputies of the 12th National Assembly of the French Fifth Republic
Deputies of the 13th National Assembly of the French Fifth Republic
Deputies of the 14th National Assembly of the French Fifth Republic
Deputies of the 15th National Assembly of the French Fifth Republic
20th-century French Jews
Jewish French politicians
Politicians from Paris
Deputies of the 16th National Assembly of the French Fifth Republic
Members of Parliament for Pyrénées-Atlantiques